Finn Myrvang (born June 20, 1937) is a Norwegian historian, folklore collector, and associate professor.

Myrvang was born in at Bjørnskinn in Andøy. Until 2004 he headed the Place Name Project in Nordland, which has registered over 180,000 place names in Nordland. He has been a place name consultant for the Language Council of Norway and the Norwegian Mapping and Cadastre Authority. Myrvang has also published historical articles on Northern Norway, especially Hålogaland. He has also published several books on folklore and place names.

Awards
 1983: Municipality of Andøy Cultural Award
 1984: Blix Prize
 1991: Municipality of Bø Cultural Award
 1996: Vesterål Museum Cultural Preservation Award
 2004: Norwegian Association of Local and Regional Authorities Medal of Merit
 2015: King's Medal of Merit

References

1937 births
People from Andøy
20th-century Norwegian historians
Norwegian folklorists
Recipients of the King's Medal of Merit in silver
Living people